Thomas Fletcher (October 21, 1779 - unknown) was a U.S. Representative from Kentucky.

Born in Westmoreland County, Pennsylvania, Fletcher settled in Montgomery County, Kentucky.
He served as member of the State house of representatives in 1803, 1805, and 1806.
He served in the War of 1812 as major of Kentucky Volunteers under General Harrison.

Fletcher was elected as a Democratic-Republican to the Fourteenth Congress to fill the vacancy caused by the resignation of United States James Clark (December 2, 1816 – March 3, 1817).
He declined to be a candidate for renomination in 1816.

Fletcher was again elected a member of the State house of representatives and served in 1817, 1820, 1821, 1823, and 1825.
He died near Sharpsburg, Kentucky.
He was interred in a private burial ground near Sharpsburg, Kentucky.

References

1779 births
19th-century deaths
Year of death unknown
American militia officers
Democratic-Republican Party members of the United States House of Representatives from Kentucky
Members of the Kentucky House of Representatives